Thomas B. Scott (February 8, 1829 – October 7, 1886) was President Pro Tem of the Wisconsin State Senate.

Biography
Scott was born on February 8, 1829, in Roxburghshire, Scotland. He apparently settled in Dekorra, Wisconsin, in 1848 and what is now Wisconsin Rapids, Wisconsin, in 1851. He was involved in the lumbering business. Scott married Ann E. Neeves and they had four children. He died of Bright's disease on October 7, 1886.

Career
Scott was a member of the Senate from 1873 to 1882. He was President Pro Tem for two terms. Other positions he held include County Clerk and County Treasurer of Wood County, Wisconsin, a delegate to the 1880 Republican National Convention and Mayor of Merrill, Wisconsin. The town of Scott in Lincoln County was named in his honor.

References

People from the Scottish Borders
19th-century Scottish people
Scottish emigrants to the United States
People from Columbia County, Wisconsin
People from Wisconsin Rapids, Wisconsin
People from Merrill, Wisconsin
Republican Party Wisconsin state senators
Mayors of places in Wisconsin
County clerks in Wisconsin
1829 births
1886 deaths
19th-century American politicians